Nazareth High School or Nazareth School is a public high school located in Nazareth, Texas (USA) and classified as a 1A school by the UIL. It is part of the Nazareth Independent School District located in east central Castro County. In 2015, the school was rated "Met Standard" by the Texas Education Agency.

Athletics
The Nazareth Swifts compete in these sports 

Baseball
Basketball
Cross Country
6-Man Football
Golf
Tennis
Track and Field

State Titles
Boys Basketball 
1986(1A), 2002(1A/D2), 2003(1A/D2), 2006(1A/D2), 2007(1A/D2), 2010(1A/D2)
Girls Basketball 
1977(B), 1978(B), 1979(B), 1980(B), 1981(1A), 1982(1A), 1984(1A), 1985(1A), 1988(1A), 1989(1A), 1990(1A), 1991(1A), 1996(1A), 2000(1A), 2001(1A), 2002(1A/D2), 2005(1A/D2), 2007(1A/D2), 2014 (1A/D2), 2015 (1A), 2017 (1A), 2018 (1A), 2019 (1A), 2020 (1A), 2023 (1A)
Girls Cross Country 
1983(3A), 1984(2A), 1985(2A), 1986(2A), 1987(2A), 2020(1A)

References

External links
Nazareth ISD

Schools in Castro County, Texas
Public high schools in Texas